Shirley is a given name and a surname originating from the English place-name Shirley, which is derived from the Old English elements scire ("shire") or scīr ("bright, clear") and lēah ("wood, clearing, meadow, enclosure"). The name makes reference to the open space where the moot (an early English assembly of freemen which met to administer justice and discuss community issues) was held. Shirley was originally a male name, but became established as a female name in 1849 due to its use in Charlotte Brontë's novel Shirley and further popularized in 1851–52 by its pseudonymous use by California Gold Rush writer Louise Amelia Knapp Smith Clappe (Dame Shirley). It was eventually brought to its highest popularity, in the 1930s, by the fame of child star Shirley Temple.

Given name

Female
Shirley (born 1946), Dutch singer
Shirley Abicair (born 1928), Australian singer, musician, actress and author
Shirley Abrahamson (1933–2020), American judge
Shirley Andrews (1915–2001), Australian biochemist
Shirley Annan (1940–2017), New Zealand netball player
Shirley Ardener, Cameroonian researcher
Shirley Armstrong (1930–2018), Irish fencer
Shirley Ascott (1930–1995), British sprint canoer
Shirley Babashoff (born 1957), American swimmer
Shirley Baker (1932–2014), British photographer
Shirley Ballas (born 1960), English ballroom dancer
Shirley Banfield (born 1937), Australian cricket player
Shirley Barber (born 1935), English author
Shirley Barker (1911–1965), American author
Shirley Barlow, English classicist
Shirley Barrett (born 1961), Australian film director
Shirley Barrie (1945–2018), Canadian playwright
Shirley Bassey (born 1937), Welsh singer
Shirley Bear (born 1936), Tobique First Nation artist
Shirley Becke (1917–2011), British police officer
Shirley Berruz (born 1991), Ecuadorian footballer
Shirley Blumberg (born 1952), Canadian architect
Shirley Bond (born 1956), Canadian politician
Shirley Bonne (born 1934), American actress and model
Shirley Booth (1898–1992), American actress
Shirley Booz (1927–2009), American model and dancer
Shirley Borhauer (born 1926), American politician
Shirley Ayorkor Botchway (born 1963), Ghanaian politician
Shirley Bottolfsen (born 1934), Irish woman
Shirley Bousquet (born 1976), French actress
Shirley D. Bowler (born 1949), American writer, editor and politician
Shirley Braha (born 1982), American television producer
Shirley Brasher (born 1934), English tennis player
Shirley Breeden, American politician
Shirley Brifman (1935–1972), Australian prostitute and brothel madam
Shirley Briggs (1918–2004), American artist, photographer, writer, and naturalist
Shirley Brill (born 1982), Israeli clarinetist
Shirley Brown (born 1947), American R&B singer
Shirley Brown (Australian author) (born 1934), Australian author
Shirley Brown (Florida politician), American politician
Shirley Burgess (born  1934), British sprinter
Shirley Burkovich (1933-2022), American baseball player
Shirley Burman (born 1934), American photographer
Shirley Caesar (born 1938), American gospel singer
Shirley Cain (born 1935), British actress
Shirley Aley Campbell (1925–2018), American painter
Shirley Carr (1929–2010), Canadian political leader
Shirley Cawley (born 1932), British athlete
Shirley Cheechoo (born 1952), Canadian Cree actress, writer, producer, director, and visual artist
Shirley Chisholm (1924–2005), American politician, educator and author, first African-American woman elected to Congress
Shirley Clamp (born 1973), Swedish singer
Shirley Bell Cole (1920–2010), American actress
Shirley Collins (born 1935), English folk singer
Shirley Collins (politician) (born 1952), Canadian former politician
Shirley Crabtree British wrestler (1930-1997)
Shirley Curry (born 1936), American YouTuber and gamer.
Shirley Douglas (1934–2020), Canadian actress and activist
Shirley Duguay (1962–1994), Canadian murder victim
Shirley Eaton (born 1937), English actress, model and author
Shirley Englehorn (1940-2022), American golfer
Shirley Adele Field (1923–1995), American politician and judge
Shirley Anne Field (born 1936), English actress
Shirley Bunnie Foy (1936–2016), American singer
Shirley M. Frye, American mathematics educator
Shirley Fulton (1954-2023), Ameeican judge
Shirley Goodman (1936–2005), American R&B singer, half of the 1950s duo Shirley and Lee
Shirley Ann Grau (1929–2020), American writer
Shirley Brice Heath, American linguistic anthropologist
Shirley Hemphill (1947–1999), American stand-up comedian and actress
Shirley Henderson (born 1965), Scottish actress
Shirley A. Hokanson (born 1936), American politician and social worker
Shirley Huffman (1928–2018), American politician
Shirley Ann Jackson (born 1946), American physicist 
Shirley Jackson (1916–1965), American writer
Shirley Jefferson (born 1953), American law school administrator and professor
Shirley Johnson (1937–2021), American politician
Shirley Brannock Jones (1925–2019), American judge
Shirley Jones (born 1934), American singer and actress
Shirley Kallek (1926–1983), American statistician
Shirley Knight (1936–2020), American actress
Shirley Kocaçınar (born 1986), Turkish-Dutch footballer
Shirley Kwan (born 1966), Hong Kong Cantopop singer
Shirley Love (born 1940), American opera singer
Shirley McKague (1935–2020), American politician
Shirley MacLaine (born 1934), American actress
Shirley Mallmann (born 1977), Brazilian model
Shirley Manson (born 1966), Scottish singer, lead vocalist of the rock band Garbage
Shirley Ardell Mason (1923–1998), American teacher
Shirley Muldowney (born 1940), American drag racer, first woman to receive a licence to drive a top fuel dragster by the NHRA
Shirley Murray (1931–2020), New Zealand hymn writer
Shirley Phelps-Roper (born 1957), American lawyer and political activist
Shirley Pitts (1934–1992), English fraudster and thief, the "Queen of shoplifters"
Shirley B. Randleman (born 1950), American politician
Shirley Rumierk, American actress
Shirley Ann Russell (1935–2002), British costume designer
Shirley Scheier (born 1953), American artist
Shirley Scott (1934–2002), American hard bop and soul-jazz organist
Shirley Setia, New Zealand singer
Shirley Sherrod, United States government employee who was unjustly fired in 2010
Shirley Adelson Siegel (1918–2020), American lawyer
Shirley-Anne Somerville (born 1974), British politician
Shirley Spork (1927–2022), American golfer
Shirley Stelfox (1941–2015), English actress
Shirley Temple (1928–2014), American actress, singer, dancer, businesswoman and diplomat
Shirley Jane Turner (1961–2003), Canadian-American murderer
Shirley Carew Titus (1892–1967), American nurse educator
Shirley Walker (1945–2006), American film and television composer
Shirley A. Walters (born 1948), Republican-American business person
Shirley Williams (1930–2021), Baroness Williams of Crosby, English politician and academic
Shirley Yeung (born 1978), Hong Kong actress
Shirley Yu, Hong Kong actress
Shirley Zhou (born 1978), Chinese player
Shirley Zussman (1914–2021), American sex therapist

Male
Shirley Abbott (ambassador) (1923–2013), American businessman, diplomat, and politician
Shirley Abbott (footballer) (1889–1947), English footballer
Shirley Brooks (1816–1874), English journalist
Shirley Burden (1908–1989), American photographer
Shirley Crabtree (1930–1997), English professional wrestler
Shirley Love (politician) (1933–2020), American politician and broadcaster journalist
Shirley Povich (1905–1998), American sports columnist and reporter
Shirley Leon Quimby (1893–1986), American physicist
Shirley Waldemar Baker (1836–1903), English missionary and Prime Minister of Tonga
Shirley Wilson (1925–2021), American football coach

Surname 

Shirley is a surname, with pockets of Shirleys living in New Hampshire, Massachusetts, Idaho, Kentucky, Mississippi, Utah, North Carolina, Tennessee, Virginia, Canada, New Zealand, Alaska, and parts of Great Britain. A work on the genealogy of the various branches of the Shirley family was published as Stemmata Shirleiana by E. P. Shirley in 1841. Their name comes from having lived in the parish of Shirley found in the counties of Derbyshire, Surrey, Hampshire and the West Midlands.
Anne Shirley (actress) (1918–1993), American actress born Dawn Evelyeen Paris
John Shirley (born 1953), American author of science-fiction, horror, thrillers, westerns, scripts, non-fiction, and lyrics. 
Bob Shirley (born 1954), American baseball player
Craig Shirley (born 1956), American author, lecturer, historian and public affairs consultant
David A. Shirley (1934–2021), American chemist
Don Shirley (1927–2013), American-Jamaican jazz pianist and composer
Drew Shirley (born 1974), American rock guitarist
Edwin Shirley (1948-2013), English Rock and Roll tour organiser
James Shirley (1596–1666), English dramatist
Jerry Shirley (born 1952), English rock drummer
Kellie Shirley (born 1981), English actress
Kevin Shirley (born 1960), South African music producer
Paul Shirley (born 1977), American basketball player and writer
Sewallis Shirley (MP) (1844–1904), British politician and founder of The Kennel Club
Simon Shirley (born 1966), Australian decathlete
Steve Shirley (born Vera Stephanie Shirley in 1933), British information technology pioneer, businesswoman and philanthropist
William Shirley (1694–1771), British colonial governor of Massachusetts

Fictional characters
Anne Shirley, the title character in Anne of Green Gables, a 1908 novel by Lucy Maude Montgomery, as well as numerous adaptations
Shirley Blythe, Anne's son, in Anne of Ingleside, Rainbow Valley, and Rilla of Ingleside, the sequels to Anne of Green Gables, all by Lucy Maude Montgomery, as well as adaptations
Miss Shirley Brahms, a fictional character in the British sitcom Are You Being Served?
Shirley Carter, a fictional character in the British soap opera EastEnders
Shirley the Loon, in Tiny Toon Adventures
Shirley Fenette, a character in the anime Code Geass
Shirley, a.k.a. Charlotte E. Yeager, a character from the mixed-media franchise Strike Witches
Shirley, a fictional character in The Jimmy Timmy Power Hour 3
Shirley, a hairdresser in the videogame MySims
Shirley Fennes, a character in the videogame Tales of Legendia
Shirley Feeney, titular character in Laverne & Shirley
Shirley Ghostman, Marc Wootton's character in High Spirits with Shirley Ghostman
Shirley Keeldar, titular character in the Charlotte Brontë novel Shirley
Shirley Partridge, the main character in The Partridge Family
Shirley Sheridan, a character in the 1934 American romantic musical movie The Cat and the Fiddle
Shirley, one of the main characters of Shaun the Sheep
Shirley, an elderly female bird in The Angry Birds Movie
The title character of the Shirley Valentine and its film adaptation

See also
John Shirley-Quirk, British opera singer
Shirl, often a diminutive form of Shirley
Shelley, a nickname for Shirley
Shurley, a variant of the surname Shirley

References

English feminine given names
English unisex given names
English-language unisex given names
Masculine given names
Feminine given names
English toponymic surnames